The University of Lynchburg, formerly Lynchburg College, is a private university associated with the Christian Church (Disciples of Christ) and located in Lynchburg, Virginia. It has approximately 2,800 undergraduate and graduate students. The university's campus spans 264 acres.

History
The University of Lynchburg was founded in 1903 by Dr. Josephus Hopwood as Virginia Christian College, a selective, independent, coeducational, and residential institution, which is affiliated with the Christian Church (Disciples of Christ).

Hopwood was president of Milligan College in Tennessee when a group of ministers and businessmen approached him about establishing a college in Lynchburg. He agreed to serve as president, after which the group purchased the failed Westover Hotel resort for $13,500, securing Lynchburg's current campus. Hopwood worked with his wife Sarah Eleanor LaRue Hopwood to establish the college based on their shared vision.

The University of Lynchburg was the first institution in the United States to train nuclear physicists and engineers for the NS Savannah project under the order of President Eisenhower, to aid in the development and operation of the world's first nuclear-powered ship.

The institution officially changed its name to Lynchburg College in 1919, citing a constituency that had expanded beyond Virginia.

Beginning with 11 faculty and 55 students, the institution has grown to 159 full-time faculty and 2,800 undergraduate and graduate students. For undergraduate students, the university offers 39 majors, 49 minors, two dual-degree programs, and the Westover Honors Program. It also confers the Master of Arts, Master of Business Administration, Master of Education, and Master of Science in Nursing as well as doctoral degrees in physical therapy, physician assistants, and educational leadership.

The University of Lynchburg hymn was written by alumnus Paul E. Waters. Its melody is derived from J. S. Bach's "O Haupt voll Blut und Wunden" Op. 135a, No. 21. The college fight song includes the phrase, "Hornet Born and Hornet Bred and when I die I'll be Hornet dead."

In fall 1994, a few months after Intel introduced its Pentium microprocessor, Thomas R. Nicely, from the University of Lynchburg, was performing computations related to the distribution of prime numbers and discovered the Pentium FDIV bug. Nicely left Lynchburg College in 2000.

In July 2018, the university changed its name from Lynchburg College to the University of Lynchburg.

Presidents

Campus

The University of Lynchburg is located in Lynchburg, Virginia, about 180 miles southwest of Washington D.C., in the Central Virginia foothills of the Blue Ridge Mountains. Most students live on campus and in nearby university-owned houses.

Student life
The University of Lynchburg has over 40 clubs and organizations for students to participate in. Examples of organization types are Greek life, student government, spiritual life, volunteer organizations, leadership programs, and publications.

Greek life
Fraternity life began on the University of Lynchburg campus in 1962, with the arrival of Sigma Mu Sigma, whose Sigma Chapter was active until disbanded in the mid-1980s. Fraternities and sororities appeared on campus again in 1992. All official Greek houses are located on Vernon Street and are currently owned by the university. UofL is 17% Greek. Listed below are the chapters of the social fraternities and sororities that comprise Greek life at UofL.

Fraternities

Sororities

National Pan-Hellenic Council Fraternities and Sororities

Athletics

The University of Lynchburg Hornets participate in NCAA Division III and the Old Dominion Athletic Conference (ODAC). The Hornets program offers 24 intercollegiate athletics programs, 23 which compete in Division III, along with equestrian, which competes in both the Intercollegiate Horse Shows Association and National Collegiate Equestrian Association formats. Since joining the ODAC as a charter member in 1976, the Hornets have recorded 205 conference titles.

In recent years, Lynchburg athletics has competed for three team national championships. The women's soccer program won Lynchburg's first-ever team national championship in 2014, defeating Williams College in penalty kicks to take the crown. In 2010, the Hornets men's soccer program reached the Division III national championship match, where they fell in overtime to Messiah College. In 2015, the men's lacrosse team made its own run to the national title game, losing to Tufts University in the championship game, 19–11.

Multiple men's cross country, indoor, and outdoor track & field athletes have captured NCAA Division III titles over the years as well. In 2009, Ricky Flynn won the Division III men's cross country championship.

Notable alumni

References

External links
 
 Official athletics website

 
Universities and colleges affiliated with the Christian Church (Disciples of Christ)
Educational institutions established in 1903
Education in Lynchburg, Virginia
Universities and colleges accredited by the Southern Association of Colleges and Schools
Tourist attractions in Lynchburg, Virginia
1903 establishments in Virginia
Buildings and structures in Lynchburg, Virginia
Non-profit organizations based in Lynchburg, Virginia
Private universities and colleges in Virginia